Microthyris lelex is a moth in the family Crambidae. It was described by Pieter Cramer in 1777. It is widespread in the Caribbean, Central America and northern South America. Records include Suriname, Puerto Rico and Jamaica. It has recently been recorded from southern Florida.

References

Moths described in 1777
Spilomelinae